Hélène Sophie Emilie Rosen, later known as Jelka Delius (30 December 186828 May 1935), was a German painter, best known as the wife of the English composer Frederick Delius. 

She was born in Belgrade in 1868. She was the youngest of five children born to Georg Rosen (1820−1891) and his wife Serena Anna Moscheles (1830−1902), also a painter, and daughter of the composer Ignaz Moscheles. 

Jelka Rosen studied art from 1892 at the private Académie Colarossi in Paris, accompanied by her newly widowed mother. Living in Montparnasse, she made the acquaintance of the composers Gabriel Fauré, Maurice Ravel and Florent Schmitt and artists Auguste Rodin, Camille Claudel, Paul Gauguin, Henri Rousseau, Edvard Munch and Ida Gerhardi.

She exhibited at the Salon des Indépendants. She met Frederick Delius at a dinner party on 16 January 1896, and found they had a shared interest in the writings of Friedrich Nietzsche and the music of Edvard Grieg. In 1897 Delius returned from business in Florida, where he had managed an orange plantation twelve years previously; he moved into her newly-acquired house in Grez-sur-Loing, a house owned by her and her mother, and they married in September 1903. She was heiress to a modest fortune from her distinguished Schleswig-Holstein family and her wealth gave Delius financial security.

Through her parental heritage, Jelka was widely read and spoke a number of languages, and it was she who often suggested texts her husband could set to music. She identified the works of Ernest Dowson for his Songs of Sunset, and Walt Whitman for Songs of Farewell. Her German translations of these texts were often published along with the music. Her artistic skills were also invaluable in sketching designs for the scenery in Beecham's 1920 revival of A Village Romeo and Juliet. Her own artwork appeared on the vocal score to Fennimore and Gerda.

She remained devoted to Delius despite his affairs with other women. In the last twelve years of Delius's life, after he became blind and paralysed with third-stage syphilis, she gave up her work to be his caregiver. She herself became ill with bowel cancer, and made it known that outside help would be welcome.  This led to Eric Fenby offering his services to the composer as an amanuensis, but he often served as Delius's personal nurse. Fenby worked with Delius for six years, during which time Jelka had intermittent absences for medical treatment.  She returned from a nursing home to be at Delius's side when he died in June 1934. Delius had wished to be buried in the garden of their home at Grez-sur-Loing, or failing that, in England. The local authorities would not permit a garden burial, and Jelka was too ill to travel, so Delius was buried in the local cemetery at Grez.

In May 1935, although she had not recovered fully, she felt she had enough strength to undertake the Channel crossing to attend his reinterment in the churchyard of the Church of Saint Peter, Limpsfield, Surrey. However, en route she contracted pneumonia and was hospitalised in Dover on arrival in England. She was then transferred to a hospital in Kensington, London, where she died on 28 May 1935, two days after her husband's reburial.  She was buried with him: they share the same grave. Her estate funded a trust, managed by Sir Thomas Beecham, to promote the works of Delius.  Beecham is now buried a short distance away.

Jelka Rosen was portrayed by the British actress Maureen Pryor in the 1968 Ken Russell film Song of Summer.

References
Notes

Citations
 
"Mrs. Delius". Obituaries, The Times, Wednesday, May 29, 1935
Sources

External links 
 The cultural association "artistes du bout du monde" presents the artist colonies of Grez-sur-Loing' grave

1868 births
1935 deaths
19th-century German painters
20th-century German painters
People from Belgrade
German people of Jewish descent
German women painters
Jewish women painters
Jewish painters
Académie Colarossi alumni
20th-century German women